The Turkish Third Army is a field army of the Turkish Army and is the country's largest army.

History
It traces its origins to 1923, but further back, the Ninth Army Troops Inspectorate was redesignated the Third Army Troops Inspectorate on 15 June 1919. General Ragıp Gümüşpala commanded the army between 1958 and 1960. In the days of the Soviet Union the Third Army was stationed on the Caucasus border to counter any Soviet attack by the Transcaucasus Military District. In 1973 the Army, with headquarters at Erzincan, had the 8th Corps at Elazığ (including the 12th Infantry Division (Turkey), today 12th Mechanised Infantry Brigade at Ağrı), the 9th Corps at Erzurum (including 9th Infantry Division at Sarıkamış (which was active to at least 1996), and the 11th Corps at Trabzon. 

After 1974–75 and the Turkish invasion of Cyprus 11th Corps headquarters was moved to North Cyprus.

Following the dissolution of the Warsaw Pact and the Soviet Union, the General Staff decided to send 120,000 men of the Third Army to the border with Iraq. This was done in order to increase readiness against any possible crisis in the area (such as during the Persian Gulf War and Iraq War). Most of the armored, mechanized, and commando brigades are located in the central region in order to act rapidly into any scenario around Turkey's borders. Today, the army garrisons the Turkish borders with Armenia and Georgia. 

Some 300 men from the Third Army were sent to serve alongside the United Nations troops in Somalia (UNITAF/UNOSOM II). In addition, Lieutenant General Cevik Bir, who had previously commanded the army's 4th Armoured Brigade, became Force Commander of UNOSOM II (1992-95).

9th Infantry Division was seemingly disbanded in 2005. A Russian source in 2007 gave the following details on the army:"the 3rd Field Army, consist[s] of 8th and 9th Army Corps, 48th Separate Infantry Brigade, 4th Separate Armoured Brigade."

9th Army Corps, which has in its composition: the 3rd infantry division, 7th, 14th, 25th separate mechanized brigade, separate mechanized infantry battalion, a separate tank battalion, deployed in the area Argadan, Kagysman, Erzurum, along the Turkish-Georgian and Armenian–Turkish border. 8th Army Corps has in its composition: 10th separate infantry brigade, 1st, 12th (Ağrı), 34th, 42nd Mechanized Brigades, 9th Separate Armored Brigade and 151st Artillery Regiment IRGC (Iranian Revolutionary Guard), located along the Turkish–Iranian border."

Order of Battle, 1941

In June 1941, the Third Army was organized as follows:

Eastern Area
IX Corps (Sarıkamış)
Erzurum Fortified Area Command
VIII Corps (Merzifon)
VII Corps (Diyarbakır)
XVIII Corps (Kars)
Kars Fortified Area Command

See also
List of Commanders of the Third Army of Turkey

References

External links

Third Army order of battle 1996 – Source Conventional Forces in Europe Treaty data

Field armies of Turkey
Erzincan
Military units and formations established in 1923
1923 establishments in Turkey